Jacques de la Presle (1888-1969) was a French composer. He won Second Prix at the Prix de Rome in 1920 with his cantata Don Juan. The following year he won the Grand Prix with a cantata Hermione, and departed to spend four years at the Villa Médicis 1922-1925.

De la Presle taught at the Paris Conservatory from 1937 to 1958. His students included Antoine Duhamel, Maurice Jarre, and André Mathieu.

References

External links 
 Musica et Memoria Article by Denis Havard de la Montagne; catalogue des œuvres.
 France catholique Interview with his grand-daughter, Alix de La Presle-Evesque.
 

1888 births
1969 deaths
People from Versailles
French classical composers
French male classical composers
Prix de Rome for composition
20th-century French male musicians